Charles Oldham may refer to:

 Charles Oldham (naturalist) (1868–1942), English naturalist
 Charles Oldham (politician) (1863–?), Australian politician
 Charles Thomas Oldham, English actor
 Charles Aemilius Oldham (1831–1869), Irish geologist who worked in India